The Battle of Shipka Pass consisted of four battles that were fought between the Russian Empire, aided by Bulgarian volunteers known as opalchentsi, and the Ottoman Empire for control over the vital Shipka Pass during the Russo-Turkish War (1877–1878). The deciding moment of the Shipka campaign, and by extent the war, came in August 1877, when a group of 5,000 Bulgarian volunteers and 2,500 Russian troops repulsed an attack against the peak by a nearly 40,000-strong Ottoman army.

First battle  

In July 1877, four Russian corps crossed the Danube River and entered Bulgaria. Preceding the main Russian army, Joseph Vladimirovich Gourko led a detachment of 11,000 men to capture the vital Balkan Mountain passes. Gourko approached the Shipka Pass, which was held by an Ottoman garrison of 4,000–5,000 soldiers under
Mehmed Hulusi Pasha.
Gourko's orders required him to act in concert with Maj. Gen. Prince Nikolai Mirsky's 9th Infantry Division, which was approaching Shipka Pass from the north. However, Gourko was delayed by having to force aside Turkish detachments and arrived at Shipka Pass one day late, on July 18.

Even without Gourko's support, Mirsky pressed his attack on July 17 with the 36th (Orel) Infantry Regiment and some Cossacks, a force of more than 2,000 men and six guns. He was facing an Ottoman force of 4,000 regular infantry, some Bashi-Bazouks, and 12 guns. Mirsky's attack on the main Ottoman positions failed, but secondary attacks captured hills on both sides of the pass. The next day, July 18, as Mirsky rested his force, Gourko attacked from the south. He sent forward two battalions of riflemen and some dismounted Cossacks, but their attack failed as well; they suffered roughly 150 casualties, including killed and wounded.

Despite beating back two Russian attacks, the Ottoman commanders at the Shipka Pass realized that they could not withstand a coordinated offensive from both north and south. On the morning of July 19, while pretending to consider the terms of surrender, the Ottoman garrison slipped away to the west in small groups, leaving behind a large cache of explosives, ammunition, and artillery.

In just over two weeks, Gourko had captured three important mountain passes but the main army was held up the day after Shipka Pass fell in the Siege of Pleven. Thus the defense of the pass was left to Bulgarian volunteers. The Ottoman Army made two major attempts to retake the pass in 1877, but was unsuccessful, as the Bulgarians were able to hold the pass against this overwhelming force, playing an important role in the war.

Second battle 
The Second Battle of Shipka Pass took place in August 1877.

After taking the pass in July 1877, the Russian forces built up a defensive position there. Russian General Stoletov placed his 7,500 defenders on three positions at St. Nicholas (today: Peak Stoletov), Central Hill and the reserves in between these two points.

Süleyman Hüsnü Pasha at Hersek was then ordered to prepare his army and rush to relieve Osman Pasha at Pleven. The Ottoman Tuna Army was effectively cut in half by the Bulgarian Mountain range. It was not possible to reach Pleven by land as the terrain was very difficult. Süleyman loaded his 25,000 troops on transport ships at the Montenegrin port of Bar and sailed them through the Adriatic, around Morea, and then through the Aegean Sea and landed them at Dedeağaç, on the coast of Thrace. The troops were then loaded on trains to Filibe from which they marched towards the southern slopes of Shipka. More troops joined. 

Suleiman Pasha had gathered about 38,000 Ottomans and was determined to retake the pass instead of simply bypassing it. It was thought that if Pleven could be defended, the Russian Army would not move south without taking it. On August 21, the Ottoman forces bombarded Russian positions and then made an attack against St. Nicholas. The next day the Ottoman forces moved their artillery up the mountainside and bombarded the pass while the infantry moved around the Russian flank. On August 23, the Ottoman forces attacked all Russian positions, with the main effort again at St. Nicholas where most of the defenders were Bulgarian volunteers. The Ottoman forces thought that the volunteer positions would be easy to capture, but this turned out to be a miscalculation. Instead, the first unit to begin to retreat were the Russians on Central Hill. However, they rallied when the 4th Rifle Brigade arrived and all Ottoman attacks were repulsed. On the 26th, an Ottoman attack on St. Nicholas (a position referred to as "the Eagle's Nest") reached the Russian trenches but was repulsed again by a Bulgarian bayonet charge. More Russian reinforcements arrived and on the 26th, an attack was made against the Ottoman position but driven back to Central Hill. This ended the battle for all practical purposes.

The Bulgarians and Russians had made a gallant stand. Near the end of the fighting, having run out of ammunition, they threw rocks and bodies of fallen comrades to repulse the Ottoman attacks.

Third battle 
In September 1877, Suleiman Pasha made another attempt to retake the Shipka Pass from the Russians after the failed attempt in August. The Russian defenses had continually been improved since August but reinforcements were limited due to the siege of Pleven. On September 13, Suleiman began to shell the Russians. The bombardment continued in earnest until the 17th when Suleiman launched a frontal assault against the St. Nicholas position. Capturing the first line of trenches, the Ottoman forces moved towards the peak. General Fyodor Radetzky, now commanding the defenses, brought in reinforcements and a Russian counterattack drove the Ottoman forces from all captured ground. Secondary Ottoman assaults to the north were repulsed as well.

Fourth battle 
The Fourth Battle of Shipka Pass took place January 5–9 1878. It was the final battle for Shipka Pass and a crushing Ottoman defeat.

Background
In December 1877, the fortress of Pleven surrendered to the Russian Army, freeing a significant number of Russian troops. General Gourko now had as many as 65,000 soldiers to contend with the Ottomans. Gourko forced the Araba Konak Pass and took Sofia. From Sofia, he moved south through the Balkan Mountains to cut off Ottoman access to Shipka Pass.

The battle
General Fyodor Radetzky, commanding the garrison, made preparations to attack from the pass on January 5 while Gourko brought up two columns under Generals Mikhail Skobelev and Nikolai Mirskii to cut off the Ottoman retreat. On January 8, Radezky's attack began but Skobelev was held up by unexpectedly heavy resistance and Mirskii attacked unsupported, making little progress. On January 9, Mirskii faced an Ottoman counter-attack, but Skobelev was able to move forward in support and defeat the Ottoman forces. Completely surrounded, the remaining Ottoman forces under Veissel Pasha surrendered the same day.

Aftermath
The defensive victory at the Shipka Pass had strategic importance for the progress of the war. Had the Ottomans been able to take the pass, they would have been in a position to threaten the supply lines of the Russian and Romanian forces in Northern Bulgaria, and organize an operation to relieve the major fortress at Pleven which was under siege at that time. The war would have then been fought effectively only in northern Bulgaria from that point on, which would have led to a stalemate, which would have created a major advantage for the Ottoman Empire in peace negotiations.

The Bulgarian volunteers played a decisive role in defending the Shipka Pass, thus denying the Ottomans a major breakthrough and a chance to turn the tide of the war. This strategic defensive victory illustrated their important role in the war and was dramatized by the Bulgarian poet and writer Ivan Vazov in his ode The Volunteers at Shipka.

The victory at Shipka Pass ensured the fall of the Pleven fortress on December 10 1877, and set the stage for the invasion of Thrace. It allowed Russian forces under Gourko to crush Suleiman Pasha's army at the Battle of Philippopolis several days later and threaten Constantinople.

With this victory and the conquest of Pleven at the end of 1877, the path towards Sofia was opened, and with it the path to victory in the war and a chance for Russia to gain an upper hand in the "Great Game" by establishing a sphere of influence in the Eastern Balkans.

Suleiman Pasha was later court-martialed due to the colossal failure at Shipka, even though the pass was already lost when he had arrived. His failure to seek alternatives, wasting of men and material that would have been essential later in the campaign, and his failure to secure his remaining troops were too blatant to forgive. He was initially sentenced to death but then commuted by Sultan Abdulhamid II and sent to exile in Baghdad. 

Today the Shipka Pass is in the Bulgarka Nature Park and is home to a monument commemorating the warriors who died in the battle.

References 

 Russian Warrior.com Sword of the Motherland 

 Compton's Home Library: Battles of the World CD-ROM

See also

 Battles of the Russo-Turkish War (1877–1878)
 Epic of the Forgotten by Ivan Vazov
 Shipka Memorial

 
Conflicts in 1877
Conflicts in 1878
1877 in Bulgaria
1878 in Bulgaria
Battles of the Russo-Turkish War (1877–1878)
Battles involving Bulgaria
Battle of Shipka Pass